Elizabeth Amoah-Tetteh (born 25 November 1945) is an educationist and Ghanaian politician. She was the Member of Parliament for the Twifu-Atti Morkwaa constituency in the 5th Parliament of the 4th Republic of Ghana.

Early life and education 
Amoah-Tetteh was born on 25 November 1945. She hails from Twifo-Abodom in the Central Region of Ghana. In 1974 she obtained a Diploma in Physical Education at the Specialist Training College in Winneba.

Career 
Amoah-Tetteh worked as an assistant director for Data Collection at the Teacher Education Division of the Ghana Education Service in Accra. She was a member of Parliament for the Twifo-Atti Morkwaa constituency and also the Deputy Minister of Education in-charge of Pre-tertiary Education during regime of His Excellency the Ex-President of Ghana John Dramani Mahama.

Politics 
Elizabeth Amoah-Tetteh first represented the Twifo-Atti Morkwaa constituency as a member of parliament in the Fifth Parliament of the Fourth Republic of Ghana after winning on the ticket of the National Democratic Congress in the 2008 Ghanaian general elections.  She obtained a total votes count of 14,724 votes out of the 28,632 valid votes cast representing 51.4% over her other candidates, Abraham Dwuma Odoom of the New Patriotic Party who pulled 13,086 votes representing 42.90% and Rose Buah-Bassuah of the Conventions People's Party who also obtained 1,577 votes representing 5.2%.

Personal life 
Amoah-Tetteh is married with seven children. She is a Christian.

References 

1945 births
Living people
Ghanaian MPs 2005–2009
Ghanaian MPs 2009–2013
National Democratic Congress (Ghana) politicians
Ghanaian Christians
People from Central Region (Ghana)